BITS or bits may refer to:

Technology 

 Plural of bit, computer memory unit.
Drill bits, cutting tools used to create cylindrical holes
Background Intelligent Transfer Service, a file transfer service
Built-in tests

Institutions 

 BITS Pilani (Birla Institute of Technology and Science), a technology school in Pilani, Rajasthan, India, with campuses in Goa, Hyderabad, and Dubai
 Business and Information Technology School, a former business school in Iserlohn (Germany), now merged into University of Europe for Applied Sciences
  or Bucharest Yiddish Studio Theater, a theater in Bucharest
 Plural of Bilateral investment treaty (BITs)

Art 

Bits (album), the fourth and final album by American indie rock band Oxford Collapse
Bits, a 2012 play by the Catalan mime comedy group Tricicle
Bits (TV series), a British television entertainment program, on air 1999–2001

See also

 Bit (disambiguation)